Mary Tamm (22 March 1950 – 26 July 2012) was a British actress, who appeared in many British TV drama series and serials, and is best known for her role as Romana I in the BBC's science fiction television series Doctor Who, starring opposite Tom Baker in the 1978–1979 story arc The Key to Time.

Early life
Tamm was born in Bradford, West Riding of Yorkshire, to Estonian immigrant parents, and attended Bradford Girls' Grammar School. She was a graduate and an associate member of the Royal Academy of Dramatic Art, where she studied from 1969–1971.

Acting career
Tamm began acting on the stage with the Birmingham Repertory Company in 1971. She moved to London in 1972 and appeared in the musical Mother Earth. Her first TV role for the BBC was as Sally in The Donati Conspiracy shown in 1973. This was followed by an episode of Warship in 1974. In 1975, she featured in Muriel Spark's The Girls of Slender Means on BBC2. Before her association with Doctor Who, Tamm acted in a few films, including Tales That Witness Madness (1973), The Odessa File (1974) and The Likely Lads (1976). In 1981, she took the part of Rhoda Dawes in Agatha Christie's Cards on the Table at London's Vaudeville Theatre.

Tamm was not initially interested in playing a companion to the Doctor, believing that the role was merely that of the "damsel in distress". She changed her mind when assured by the producers that Romana would be a member of the Doctor's own race and therefore as capable as he. Tamm left the programme after only one season because she felt that the character had reverted to the traditional assistant role and could not be developed further. In a 2007 interview, she stated that she was willing to shoot a regeneration sequence to allow a smooth transition between her tenure and that of her eventual successor (Lalla Ward), but was not invited to do so. One source states that pregnancy was the reason that she was not asked to return, which Tamm denied as a false rumour invented by producer John Nathan-Turner.

After leaving the series, Tamm took leading roles in two BBC 1 dramas, The Treachery Game (1980) and its sequel The Assassination Run (1981) alongside Malcolm Stoddard. She subsequently appeared in Barry Letts' production of Jane Eyre on BBC1 in 1983, opposite Timothy Dalton. She had a leading role in the sitcom The Hello, Goodbye Man opposite Ian Lavender in 1984 for BBC 2, around the same time as her guest appearance in Bergerac. In the early 1990s she was a regular guest panellist on the ITV morning quiz show Crosswits.

Subsequently, Tamm played the characters of Penny Crosbie in the soap opera Brookside from 1993 to 1996, and Yvonne Edwards in the BBC drama Paradise Heights (2002), as well as guest roles in many other television programmes, including Crime Traveller on BBC1, another time travel drama. Tamm returned as Pandora in the second series of the Gallifrey audio plays produced by Big Finish Productions. Her first such appearance was in Gallifrey: Lies (2005). She also appeared (as herself) in a special feature in the 2007 DVD boxed set release of The Key to Time, discussing her experiences on the programme. In August 2009, Tamm made a brief one-week appearance as Orlenda in EastEnders. Reprising the role of Romana, Tamm recorded seven new Doctor Who audio adventures for Big Finish Productions with Tom Baker shortly before her death, which were released in 2013 as series 2 of the Fourth Doctor Adventures.

Personal life
Mary Tamm was married to Marcus Ringrose, an insurance executive, from 1978 until her death from cancer on 26 July 2012. They had one daughter, Lauren, born November 1979. Ringrose himself died from a heart attack just hours after Tamm's funeral.

Her autobiography, entitled First Generation, was published in September 2009 by Fantom Films. Before her death she had been working on a second part of her autobiography, Second Generation, which was published in 2014.

Filmography

Film

Television

References

External links
 

1950 births
2012 deaths
Alumni of RADA
English people of Estonian descent
Deaths from cancer in England
English film actresses
English soap opera actresses
English television actresses
People educated at Bradford Girls' Grammar School
20th-century English actresses
21st-century English actresses
Actresses from Bradford